Bill Puterbaugh (June 6, 1936 – October 9, 2017) was an American racing driver in the USAC Championship Car series. He raced in the 1967-1971, the 1975–1977, and the 1979 seasons, with 31 career starts, including the 1975-1977 Indianapolis 500.  He finished in the top ten 11 times, with his best finish in 6th position in 1968 at Springfield and in 1969 at Sacramento.  His 7th-place finish in the 1975 Indianapolis 500 earned him Rookie of the Year.

Puterbaugh died at home surrounded by his loving family in Brownsburg, IN on October 9, 2017 at the age of 81.

USAC Championship Car season

Indianapolis 500 results

References

1936 births
2017 deaths
American racing drivers
Indianapolis 500 drivers
Indianapolis 500 Rookies of the Year
Racing drivers from Indianapolis
USAC Silver Crown Series drivers